Les Burns (23 February 1920 – 21 June 2015) was an  Australian rules footballer who played with St Kilda in the Victorian Football League (VFL).

Notes

External links 

1920 births
2015 deaths
Australian rules footballers from Victoria (Australia)
St Kilda Football Club players